The Zastava M88 is a semi-automatic pistol produced by Zastava Arms, it is a compact redesign of the Zastava M57 pistol.

Features
A simple handgun available in 9×19mm Parabellum and .40 S&W with non-adjustable sights and a single-action trigger, just like its older cousin, the TT-33. The M88 has a shorter 3.5 inch barrel and a different hammer position. A variant of the pistol called the M88A features an external safety on the slide and an internal firing pin block safety.

Usage

The M88 saw limited use as a service pistol with the Yugoslav police and military forces, but was replaced by the higher capacity CZ 99 series, while sometimes used as a training pistol in some military training camps in Serbia. Since then it has been widely available for civilian purchase. The M88 and M88A are also imported into the United States by the K-VAR/FIME Group.

References

External links
 EAAcorp.com - Zastava M88 pistol

Semi-automatic pistols of Yugoslavia
Semi-automatic pistols of Serbia
9mm Parabellum semi-automatic pistols
.40 S&W semi-automatic pistols
Zastava Arms